George Kelley may refer to:

George V. Kelley (1843–1905), American officer in Civil War Union Army
George Davy Kelley (1848–1911), English trades unionist
George Kelley (American football) (before 1880–after 1901), American college coach
George Biddle Kelley (1884–1962), American founder of Alpha Phi Alpha Fraternity at Cornell University

See also
George Kelley Paperback and Pulp Fiction Collection, collection at State University of New York at Buffalo
Kelley (name)
George Kelly (disambiguation)